Rogério Paulo Cesar de Sá (born on 1 October 1964) is a South African soccer manager and former player who played as a goalkeeper.

De Sá is also one of the handful of South Africans who have represented their country in three different sports – soccer, basketball and indoor soccer.

Club career
De Sá started his professional career after Kwikot Benoni coach Jingles Pereira, who knew De Sá's father, knew that the goalkeeper was not playing professional football, promptly signing the player.

During his career, De Sá played for major South African clubs Moroka Swallows and Mamelodi Sundowns, both of which he captained as well.

International career
De Sá was capped only once in his career during a 1994 African Cup of Nations qualification match against Zambia. He was part of the 1996 African Nations Cup-winning squad.

Coaching career
De Sá began his coaching career in 2001 at Bidvest Wits, and would remain in charge for four years.

De Sá rejoined The Students in June 2007 after an absence of two years which he spent coaching Engen Santos.

In September 2012, De Sá was appointed as the coach for Orlando Pirates.  He was chosen as PSL Coach of the Season after the 2002–03 season.

On 31 January 2014, De Sá resigned as coach of Orlando Pirates.

Da Sá was appointed Ajax Cape Town coach in 2014, but stepped down from the position after a winless start to the 2016/17 PSL season.

In January 2017, De Sá was announced as Maritzburg United's manager, but he parted ways with the club in March of the same year.

On 8 September 2017, De Sá was named as the head coach of Platinum Stars after the departure of British coach Peter Butler.

He also acted as Bafana's goalkeeping coach during Carlos Queiroz's reign and, in September 2021, was recruited by Queiroz to join him as Assistant Coach to the Egyptian national football team. He continued with Queiroz as assistant coach of Iran for the 2022 FIFA World Cup.

Honours

Player
South Africa
 1996 African Cup of Nations

Coach
Wits University
 Nedbank Cup: 2009–10

Orlando Pirates
 Nedbank Cup: 2009–10
 Carling Black Label Cup: 2012, 2014
 CAF Champions League Runner-up: 2013

Ajax Cape Town
 MTN 8: 2015

References

Sources
 Roger De Sa: Man of Action
 DE SA, Roger with LANDHEER, Ernest (2003, South Africa Spearhead Press)

1964 births
Living people
South African men's basketball players
South African soccer players
South African soccer managers
Mamelodi Sundowns F.C. players
Moroka Swallows F.C. players
Association football goalkeepers
Mozambican emigrants to South Africa
Portuguese expatriates in Mozambique
Sportspeople from Maputo
South African people of Portuguese descent
White South African people
South Africa international soccer players
Bidvest Wits F.C. players
1996 African Cup of Nations players
Orlando Pirates F.C. managers
Ajax Cape Town F.C. managers
Africa Cup of Nations-winning players